Franklyn is both a surname and a given name. Notable people with the name include:

Surname:
 Charles Franklyn (1896–1982), British medical doctor
 Delano Franklyn,  Jamaican politician
 George Woodroffe Franklyn (1800–1870), British politician
 Harold Franklyn (1885–1963)  British soldier of the world wars
 John Franklyn-Robbins (1924–2009), British actor
 Milt Franklyn (1897–1962), Musical composer and arranger
 Sabina Franklyn (born 1954), English actress and William Franklyn's daughter
 William Franklyn (1925–2006), British actor

Given name:
 Franklyn Ajaye (born 1949), American stand-up comedian
 Franklyn Barrett (1873–1964), Australian film director and cinematographer
 Franklyn Baur (1903–1950), vocal recording artist
 Franklyn Bellamy, British actor
 Franklyn Dennis (born 1947), Canadian international cricketer
 Franklyn Farnum (1878–1961), American screen character actor
 Franklyn Germán (born 1980), Dominican Republic baseball pitcher
 Franklyn Gracesqui (born 1979), Dominican Republic baseball pitcher
 Franklyn Hinds (born 1967), Cayman Islands cricketer
 Franklyn Kilome, baseball player
 Franklyn MacCormack (1906–1971), American radio personality
 Franklyn Modell (1917–2016), American cartoonist
 Franklyn Rose (born 1972), West Indian cricketer
 Franklyn Seales (1952–1990), American film, television and stage actor
 Franklyn Bliss Snyder (1884–1958), American scholar of Scottish literature
 Franklyn Stephenson (born 1959), Barbadian cricketer

Place:
 Franklyn, South Australia

See also
 Franklyn B Paverty, Australian bush band
 Franklin (disambiguation)